Matteo Pivotto (born September 5, 1974 in Montecchio Maggiore) is an Italian professional football player.

He spent 6 seasons (70 games, 2 goals) in the Serie A for A.S. Roma, U.S. Lecce and Modena F.C.

External links
 Career summary by playerhistory.com

1974 births
Living people
Italian footballers
Serie A players
Serie B players
Hellas Verona F.C. players
U.S. Massese 1919 players
A.S. Roma players
A.C. ChievoVerona players
U.S. Lecce players
Palermo F.C. players
Modena F.C. players
U.S. Triestina Calcio 1918 players
Ravenna F.C. players
Aurora Pro Patria 1919 players
Association football defenders